Little Ridge is a former settlement in Newfoundland and Labrador.  It was located on the Avalon Peninsula near to Thornlea and Bellevue..

References

Populated places in Newfoundland and Labrador